Urman (Bashkir and ) is a rural locality (a village) in Baygildinsky Selsoviet, Nurimanovsky District, Bashkortostan, Russia. The population was 65 as of 2010. There is 1 street.

Geography 
Urman is located 24 km southwest of Krasnaya Gorka (the district's administrative centre) by road. Ukarlino is the nearest rural locality.

References 

Rural localities in Nurimanovsky District